Derfel may refer to:
Saint Derfel, 6th century British monk and reputed follower of King Arthur
Derfel Cadarn, fictionalized version of the above
Robert Jones Derfel, Welsh poet and political writer

See also
Derf, people with the given name
Derfel Limestone, a geologic formation in Wales

Welsh masculine given names